Beloglinsky (masculine), Beloglinskaya (feminine), or Beloglinskoye (neuter) is the name of several rural localities in Russia:
Beloglinsky (rural locality), a settlement in Krepinsky Selsoviet of Kalachyovsky District of Volgograd Oblast
Beloglinskoye, a selo in Tersky District of the Kabardino-Balkar Republic